The 2019–20 UCLA Bruins women's basketball team represented the University of California, Los Angeles during the 2019–20 NCAA Division I women's basketball season. The Bruins, led by ninth year head coach Cori Close, played their home games at Pauley Pavilion and competed as members of the Pac-12 Conference.

Because of the COVID-19 pandemic, the NCAA Tournament was canceled. The Bruins finished the season 26–5 and 14–4 in conference play for a second-place tie in the Pac-12. They advanced to the semifinals of the Pac-12 Tournament, where they lost to Stanford. Had the NCAA Tournament not been canceled, the Bruins were projected to receive a #3-seed and to host a 1st/2nd Round pod. UCLA's overall winning percentage of .839 was its highest since the 2010–11 season, when the Bruins finished 28–5 (.848).

The Bruins were 17–0 when scoring at least 70 points and 22–0 when holding opponents to under 67 points.

Offseason

Departures

2019 recruiting class

Roster

 March 7, 2019 - The NCAA granted Japreece Dean an additional year of eligibility since she played in only two games at the start of her sophomore year at Texas Tech before transferring to UCLA. However, because of those two games she played, she would have to sit out the first two games of the 2019–20 season.

Schedule

|-
!colspan=9 style=| Non-conference regular season

|-
!colspan=9 style=| Pac-12 regular season

|-
!colspan=9 style=| Pac-12 Women's Tournament

Rankings
2019–20 NCAA Division I women's basketball rankings

Honors 
 December 2, 2019 – Japreece Dean was named the Pac-12 Player of the Week
 December 23, 2019 – Michaela Onyenwere received her first-ever Pac-12 Player of the Week
 February 10, 2020 – Michaela Onyenwere was named the Pac-12 Player of the Week

See also
2019–20 UCLA Bruins men's basketball team

References

UCLA
UCLA Bruins women's basketball
UCLA Bruins basketball, women
UCLA Bruins basketball, women
UCLA Bruins basketball, women
UCLA Bruins basketball, women